Hong Kong has over 9,000 high-rise buildings, of which over 4,000 are skyscrapers standing taller than  with 517 buildings above . The tallest building in Hong Kong is the 108-storey International Commerce Centre, which stands  and is the 12th tallest building in the world. Furthermore, reflective of the city's high population densities, Hong Kong has more inhabitants living at the 15th floor or higher, and more buildings of at least  and  height, than any other city in the world.

Most of Hong Kong's buildings are concentrated on the northern shore of Hong Kong Island, Kowloon, and the new towns (satellite towns) of the New Territories, such as Tsuen Wan and Sha Tin. Additional high-rises are located along Hong Kong Island's southern shoreline and areas near the stations of the Mass Transit Railway (MTR).

The skyline of Hong Kong Island is famed for its unique arrangement, with surrounding mountains and Victoria Harbour complementing the rows of skyscrapers along the shore. Each evening, 44 buildings on the shores of Victoria Harbour participate in A Symphony of Lights, a synchronised show named by the Guinness Book of World Records as the largest permanent light fixture in the world.



History 
The first high-rise in Hong Kong was the Hong Kong & Shanghai Bank, completed in 1935. High-rise construction was limited in the early part of the 20th century. However, beginning in the 1970s, Hong Kong experienced a general trend of high-rise building construction that has continued to the present. This trend is in large part a result of the city's rugged, mountainous terrain and lack of flat land. The city entered a construction boom in 1980, which lasted roughly until 1993. Among the buildings built during these years are Hopewell Centre (1980), Bank of China Tower (1990), and Central Plaza (1992), three of the territory's tallest buildings upon their respective dates of completion.

Beginning in 1998, Hong Kong entered a second, much larger building boom that lasted until the early 2010s. The second boom saw the completion of the International Commerce Centre, Two International Finance Centre, Nina Tower I, and One Island East. At the height of the construction boom in 2003, 56 skyscrapers over 150 m (492 ft) were completed throughout the city. The proliferation of multi-tower, high-rise building complexes, such as public housing estates and transit-oriented developments near MTR stations (known as rail + property development), greatly increased the number of skyscrapers.

Unlike previous building trends of the 1980s and early 1990s, many high-rise buildings of the second boom are for residential use due to a surge in demand for luxury housing properties in Hong Kong. In addition, the closure of the Kai Tak Airport and the relaxation of height restrictions on the Kowloon Peninsula allowed many tall skyscrapers to rise in Kowloon, such as The Masterpiece, Victoria Dockside and The Cullinan, all of which exceed . Skyscrapers also grew in the New Territories, such as the developments of Metro Town and LOHAS Park in Tseung Kwan O. However, proposals for large scale building projects slowed down considerably over the 2000s due to a heightened community awareness of skyscraper's effect on urban ecology, such as changes to air circulation (dubbed as "wall effect") and air pollution.

Notable buildings 

 International Commerce Centre (abbreviated ICC), located at 1 Austin Road, West Kowloon. It is owned and jointly developed by MTR Corporation Limited and Sun Hung Kai Properties as Phase 7 of the Union Square Development. Rising , the ICC is the tallest building in Hong Kong as well as the 13th tallest building in the world. Notable tenants include Deutsche Bank, Credit Suisse, Morgan Stanley, ABN-AMRO and Accenture.
 Two International Finance Centre (abbreviated 2IFC), located above the MTR Hong Kong station at 8 Finance Street, Central. It became the tallest building in Hong Kong upon its completion in 2003 until it was surpassed by the ICC in 2009. It was built as the second phase of the International Finance Centre commercial development. Notable tenants include UBS, Samsung Electronics, Hong Kong Monetary Authority and BNP Paribas.
 Central Plaza, located at 18 Harbour Road, Wan Chai. It was the tallest building in Hong Kong when it was built in 1992 until it was surpassed by 2IFC in 2003. The Central Plaza was also the tallest building in Asia from 1992 until 1996, surpassed by Shun Hing Square in Shenzhen. The building is notable for its unique exterior shape as well as its LIGHTIME lighting system. It also houses the world's highest church inside a skyscraper, Sky City Church.
 Bank of China Tower (abbreviated BOC Tower), located at 1 Garden Road, in Central. It is currently the fourth tallest building in Hong Kong. It was the tallest building outside of the United States from 1990 to 1992, and was the first building outside of the United States to pass the  mark. The exterior design of the building resembles bamboo shoots, symbolizing livelihood and prosperity in Feng Shui.
 Cheung Kong Center at 2 Queen's Road Central, Central. The building's top floor contains a private residence for Cheung Kong Holdings' billionaire Chairman Li Ka-Shing.
 The Center, located at 99 Queen's Road Central, Central. The skyscraper's unique structure is entirely composed of steel and lacks a reinforced concrete core.
 Hopewell Centre, located at 183 Queen's Road East, Wanchai. The building signifies the eastern expansion of Hong Kong's central business district. The Hopewell Centre has a unique cylindrical shaped design with a revolving restaurant on the 62nd level of the building. Designed by Sir Gordon Wu, chairman of Hopewell Holdings, the building serves as the headquarters of his company.
 HSBC Main Building (also known as HSBC Tower), located at 1 Queen's Road Central, Central. Designed by the famed British architect Norman Foster, the building took seven years to complete, and is noted as being the most expensive building in the world at completion at HK$5.2 billion (US$668 million) in 1985. Together with Statue Square, the building also serves as a gathering place for thousands of Filipino domestic workers during weekends and holidays.
 Jardine House (originally called Connaught Centre), located at 1 Connaught Place, Central. Upon completion in 1973, the -tall skyscraper was the tallest building in Hong Kong and Asia. The building features round windows, as opposed to traditional rectangular windows, for a stronger curtain wall and thinner structural frame. These round windows also earned the building a nickname of "The House of a Thousand Arseholes."

Tallest buildings 
This includes spires and architectural details but does not include antenna masts. The "Year" column indicates the year in which a building was completed.

* Indicates still under construction, but has been topped out.

Tallest under construction or proposed

This includes spires and architectural details but does not include antenna masts. The "Year" column indicates the year in which a building is expected to be complete.

*Table entry without text indicate that one or more of the following information regarding building heights, floor counts and/or year of completion has not yet been released.

Demolished buildings 

Notable cancelled or vision projects 
This lists notable projects that were abandoned, cancelled or never meant to be built that had a planned height of at least .

* Table entries without text indicate that information regarding floor counts have not been determined or remain unknown.

Timeline of tallest buildings 
This lists buildings that once held the title of tallest building in Hong Kong.

See also 

 Architecture of Hong Kong
 List of cities with most skyscrapers
 List of tallest buildings in China

Notes 
There are a number of completed buildings that are at least 50 storeys tall that do not have height figures listed as seen here , here  and here  on Emporis as well as CTBUH.
B.This building was constructed as the Connaught Centre, but has since been renamed Jardine House.
C.Tower numbers may not be assigned sequentially in Hong Kong's multi-tower complexes due to the number 4 and its meaning in Chinese culture. Hence, it is common practice to skip the label "Tower 4" in complexes with four or more actual towers. A building named "Tower 8" in a complex may not imply that there are eight actual towers in said complex. As an example, a complex of six actual towers may have the first trio of towers be assigned Towers 1, 2, 3 and the second trio Towers 5, 6 and 7. The same may occur for large projects that have four or more phases of development.
D.For groups of two or more interconnected buildings, the height shown refers to the tallest building of the group. The floor count shown refers to that of the tallest building in question.
E.Due to common practice of skipping floors with the number 4 (e.g. 4, 14, 24, 34, ... and so on) and 13 in Hong Kong, floors may not be labelled sequentially. Thus a building's total count of actual floors may not be equal to the number of the top floor. As an example, one residential tower has a top floor labelled "88", but contains only 42 actual floors. Sources that state the number of the top floor for a building's floor count may overstate the actual number of floors for the building in question. See numbers in Chinese culture, unlucky 13 and thirteenth floor for more background information.
An official figure has not been determined.
G.One design iteration of the Kowloon MTR Tower has a spire that reached  in height.
An official figure has not been determined.

References 
 General
 CTBUH.org – Hong Kong
 Emporis.com – Demolished buildings of Hong Kong

 Specific

External links 

 Diagram of Hong Kong skyscrapers on SkyscraperPage
 Evolution of the Hong Kong Skyline

 
Tallest buildings
Hong Kong
Hong Kong